Clubul Sportiv Concordia Chiajna, commonly known as Concordia II Chiajna, is a Romanian professional football club founded in 2008 and based in Chiajna, Ilfov County. The team currently plays in the Liga III and is the reserve squad of Romanian second league side, Concordia Chiajna.

The team was founded in the summer of 2008 in order to have a team of seniors where the players who just finished the youth academy can be accommodated with the level of seniors in the idea of being subsequently promoted to the first team. The team was enrolled in Liga IV Bucharest where it remained only for two seasons, subsequently buying a place in the third tier. In the summer of 2018, after seven seasons spent in the third tier, "the Little Eagles" withdrew from the league, but just to be enrolled back in 2020.

Honours

Other performances 
Appearances in Liga III: 8
Best finish in Liga III: 3rd  (2014–15)

Players

Second team squad

Out on loan

Club officials

Board of directors

Current technical staff

League history

References

External links

Football clubs in Ilfov County
Chiajna
Association football clubs established in 2008
Liga III clubs
Liga IV clubs
2008 establishments in Romania